The First Affiliated Hospital of Xinjiang Medical University is a teaching hospital in the western border of area of Urumqi, Xinjiang, China affiliated with Xinjiang Medical University.  Founded in 1956 together with the university, the hospital is a college of clinical medicine affiliated with XMU.  The hospital currently has 1357 beds with more than 1500 specialists.

It has been more than 50 years since the building of this hospital it has been since then adhered to the culture of building homes in Xinjiang, giving strong science education and producing talented young enthusiastic doctors. The hospitals' main policy is increasing the level of health care, discipline and gradually building a comprehensive scientific research and science technology infrastructure construction and management system. 
The Ministry of Health has been supervising the management since the 1960s. It has also been awarded the title of being in top ten hospitals in northwest China. 
This hospitals has become the preferred educational institution for the ethnic people of Xinjiang.

In June 2008, hospital management through a special fund has issued orders to build a new hospital building for the ever increasing number of patients in the city of Urumqi.

History
Hospital was founded in 1956, the country's first Five-Year Plan for China Central Plains of the Soviet Union aid of 156 key construction projects.
In 1997, the hospital decided to invest in the information technology projects and make it fully functional in May 2000. Now hospital has a fully operational computer network, it has also implemented the out-patient medical information card system, electronic records of clinical departments has also been started.
The newly built 20,000 m2 Science and Technology Building has built up a new atmosphere of healthy competition in scientific research. Animal Research Centre is also being built by the fund of Xinjiang and Chinese Government funds.

Structure
Hospital is covering a total of 168,000 m2. The total construction area is 182,500 m2, of which 106,500 m2 is having medical care structures, teaching area is 17,000 m2, the research area is 12,700 m2; approximately 44% area is covered by grass and parks. Hospital has a complete medical testing equipment and more conventional set of internationally advanced level of high-tech equipment.

Departments
Hospital has been set up into 42 clinical and 11 medical technology departments. It now has 27 teaching and research, one clinical post-doctoral research station, three doctorate (in Clinical Medicine, surgery and medicine) research station, three masters-level research stations (in professional Clinical Medicine degree, professional degree of oral medicine and clinical medicine, covering 15 secondary subjects and 33 clinical subjects). Hospitals' clinical teaching building also have a nursing skills and training assessment center. It also has an Institute of Hydatid Disease; which is the most prevalent parasitic disease in Xinjiang.

Staff

At present there are 2,100 beds in the hospital. The total number of staff is 1,894 and the total number of hospital workers' count goes to 2,800. There are 2325 health technicians, 262 highly trained health technicians, 62 PhD physicians, 301 Masters Level Physicians, 565 undergraduate health technicians, 1397 specialist physicians and surgeons.

References

External links 
 Official Website

Xinjiang Medical University
Hospital buildings completed in 1956
Hospital XMU 1
Hospitals in Xinjiang
Hospitals established in 1956
1956 establishments in China